Thalia Charalambous (born 26 August 1989) is a Cypriot long-distance runner. She competed in the women's half marathon at the 2020 World Athletics Half Marathon Championships held in Gdynia, Poland. She also competed at the 2022 Mediterranean Games held in Oran, Algeria.

References

External links 
 

Living people
1989 births
Place of birth missing (living people)
Cypriot female long-distance runners
Athletes (track and field) at the 2022 Mediterranean Games
Mediterranean Games competitors for Cyprus